Mass is the quantity of matter in a physical body and a measure of the body's inertia.

Mass or Maß may also refer to:

Arts, entertainment, and media

Music
Mass (music), a choral composition that sets liturgical text to music
Mass (Stravinsky), a composition by Igor Stravinsky
Mass (Bernstein), a musical theater work by Leonard Bernstein
Mass (English band), a post-punk band
Mass (Grotus album), 1996
Mass (Alastair Galbraith album), 2011
Mass (The Gazette album), 2021
The Mass (album), by musical project Era

Other uses in arts, entertainment, and media
 Mass (2004 film), Indian Telugu-language film
 Mass (2021 film), American drama film
Mass (novel), a 1973 novel by Filipino author F. Sionil José
 Mass media, communication channels which can reach huge numbers of people
 The Masses, a socialist magazine published in the US from 1911 to 1917

Military
MASS (decoy system), a naval defence system
M26 Modular Accessory Shotgun System (or MASS), a developmental shotgun for the M16 rifle/M4 carbine family of guns
MASS, Marine Air Support Squadrons within the United States Marine Corps

People with the name
Mass (surname)
Peter Harris (producer), an electronic musician who uses the alias Mass
Mass Sarr, Jr. (born 1973), a Liberian former footballer

Places
Mass City, Michigan, also known as Mass, an unincorporated community in the United States
Maß (Lauer) (pronounced "mass"), a river of Bavaria, Germany, left tributary of the Lauer
Massachusetts (abbreviated Mass or MA), a U.S. state in New England
Massachusetts Bay (abbreviated Mass Bay), a bay off the U.S. state of the same name

Religion
Mass (liturgy), an act of worship in some Christian churches
Mass in the Catholic Church, the main act of worship of the Catholic Church
Sunday mass

Society 
 Mass Party, a political party in Thailand (2006–2009?)
 Mass society, a society based on relations between huge numbers of people, whose prototypical denizen is the "mass man"
 Mass politics, politics in the mass society, featuring especially the modern political party

Other uses
Mass (mass spectrometry), a chemical analysis technique
Autonomous cargo ship, also known as a Maritime Autonomous Surface Ships (MASS)
BrightBus, a former British vehicle body manufacturer and school bus operator that previously traded as MASS Engineering
Maß (pronounced "mass"), a German word describing the amount of beer in a regulation mug, also used for the mug itself
Manab Adhikar Sangram Samiti, a human rights NGO in Assam (India)
Marc and Eva Stern Math and Science School (Stern MASS)
Tumor, or mass, a neoplasm that is enlarged

See also
Landmass or land mass, a continuous area of land
Massive (disambiguation)
Weight (disambiguation)